Aurelius Capital Management is an American hedge fund. The company is run by Mark Brodsky, a lawyer formerly employed by Elliott Associates.
Mark Brodsky is a University of Pennsylvania graduate (BA) in Political Science in 1974
In October 2013, Aurelius attempted to force the government of Argentina to pay $1.3bn following the 2010 Argentinian default on debt. The fund is branded a "vulture" by Argentina for its stance.

Aurelius has been involved in debt restructuring of Dubai World and Tribune Co; and, in October 2013, The Co-operative Bank. Aurelius led a push to apply $54 billion of Petrobas bonds governed by U.S. law in the state of New York. In 2015 Aurelius bought large amounts of Ukraine's government debt before securing a preferential deal on its restructuring. It has also been involved in the restructuring of debts owed by Puerto Rico.

References

Hedge fund firms of the United States